The Hebrew Technical School for Girls was a vocational school whose goal was to provide free instruction for women to pursue jobs in commercial and industrial sectors. It was founded in 1880 as the Louis Down-Town Sabbath and Day School by the educator Minnie Dessau Louis (1841-1922). It was founded with the assistance of Temple Emanu-el for "the express purpose of elevating working-class Jewish immigrant girls." Their building was located at 240 Second Avenue in Manhattan, New York City.

The school had two divisions. The Commercial Department provided courses in stenography, typewriting, bookkeeping, English, penmanship, commercial arithmetic and geography. The Manual Department, intended for those going into millenary or dress making, offered courses in sewing, millenary, embroidery, drawing and costume design.

In 1892, Lillian Wald, a 25-year-old nurse then enrolled in the Women’s Medical College, volunteered to teach a class on home health care for immigrant women at the Louis Down-Town Sabbath and Daily School. Because of her encounters there, she eventually founded the Nurses' Settlement, which eventually became the Henry Street Settlement.

The school closed in 1932, as New York City public schools began to offer similar courses. The charity renamed itself the Jewish Foundation for Education of Women, and provided grants for undergraduate and graduate study. The building now houses the Manhattan Comprehensive Night and Day School.

External links
Jewish Foundation for Education of Women Records at the New York Public Library Archives

References

1880 establishments in New York (state)
1932 disestablishments in New York (state)
Defunct schools in New York City
Vocational education
Technical schools
Educational institutions established in 1880
Educational institutions disestablished in 1932
Private high schools in Manhattan
Girls' schools in New York City